The C. F. Pettengill House is a historic house at 53 Revere Road in Quincy, Massachusetts.  The -story wood-frame house was probably built in the 1890s; it is a finely-detailed version of a Queen Anne style house which was once common in Quincy.  Its features include varied gabling and shingle decoration, as well as a front porch decorated with latticework and turned posts. C. F. Pettengill owned a nearby jewelry and clock shop.

The house was listed on the National Register of Historic Places in 1989.

See also
National Register of Historic Places listings in Quincy, Massachusetts

References

Houses in Quincy, Massachusetts
Queen Anne architecture in Massachusetts
Houses completed in 1890
National Register of Historic Places in Quincy, Massachusetts
Houses on the National Register of Historic Places in Norfolk County, Massachusetts